Yuxarı Salahlı (also, Upper Salahly) is a village and municipality in the Qazakh District of Azerbaijan.  It has a population of 3,406.

Notable natives 
    
 Samad Vurgun — prominent Azerbaijani poet, People's Poet of Azerbaijan SSR (1943).
 Ibrahim bey Usubov — Azerbaijani Major General in Imperial Russian Army and Azerbaijan Democratic Republic.
 Molla Panah Vagif — 18th century poet and statesman

References 

Populated places in Qazax District